Black comedy, also known as dark comedy, morbid humor, gallows humor, or dark humor is a style of comedy that makes light of subject matter that is generally considered taboo, particularly subjects that are normally considered serious or painful to discuss. Writers and comedians often use it as a tool for exploring vulgar issues by provoking discomfort, serious thought, and amusement for their audience. Thus, in fiction, for example, the term black comedy can also refer to a genre in which dark humor is a core component. Popular themes of the genre include death, crime, poverty, suicide, slavery, genocide, forced labor, torture, war, violence, terrorism, discrimination, disease, racism, sexism, homophobia, and human sexuality.

Black comedy differs from both blue comedy—which focuses more on crude topics such as nudity, sex, and body fluids—and from straightforward obscenity. Whereas the term black comedy is a relatively broad term covering humor relating to many serious subjects, gallows humor tends to be used more specifically in relation to death, or situations that are reminiscent of dying. Black humor can occasionally be related to the grotesque genre. Literary critics have associated black comedy and black humor with authors as early as the ancient Greeks with Aristophanes.

Etymology 
The term black humour (from the French humour noir) was coined by the Surrealist theorist André Breton in 1935 while interpreting the writings of Jonathan Swift. Breton's preference was to identify some of Swift's writings as a subgenre of comedy and satire in which laughter arises from cynicism and skepticism, often relying on topics such as death.

Breton coined the term for his 1940 book Anthology of Black Humor (Anthologie de l'humour noir), in which he credited Jonathan Swift as the originator of black humor and gallows humor (particularly in his pieces Directions to Servants (1731), A Modest Proposal (1729), Meditation Upon a Broomstick (1710), and in a few aphorisms). In his book, Breton also included excerpts from 45 other writers, including both examples in which the wit arises from a victim with which the audience empathizes, as is more typical in the tradition of gallows humor, and examples in which the comedy is used to mock the victim. In the last cases, the victim's suffering is trivialized, which leads to sympathizing with the victimizer, as analogously found in the social commentary and social criticism of the writings of (for instance) Sade.

History 

Among the first American writers who employed black comedy in their works were Nathanael West  and Vladimir Nabokov, although at the time the genre was not widely known in the US. The concept of black humor first came to nationwide attention after the publication of a 1965 mass-market paperback titled Black Humor, edited by Bruce Jay Friedman. The paperback was one of the first American anthologies devoted to the concept of black humor as a literary genre. With the paperback, Friedman labeled as "black humorists" a variety of authors, such as J. P. Donleavy, Edward Albee, Joseph Heller, Thomas Pynchon, John Barth, Vladimir Nabokov, Bruce Jay Friedman himself, and Louis-Ferdinand Céline. Among the recent writers suggested as black humorists by journalists and literary critics are Roald Dahl, Kurt Vonnegut, Warren Zevon, Christopher Durang, Philip Roth, and Veikko Huovinen. The motive for applying the label black humorist to the writers cited above is that they have written novels, poems, stories, plays, and songs in which profound or horrific events were portrayed in a comic manner. Comedians like Lenny Bruce, who since the late 1950s have been labeled for using "sick comedy" by mainstream journalists, have also been labeled with "black comedy".

Nature and functions 
Sigmund Freud, in his 1927 essay Humour (Der Humor), puts forth the following theory of black comedy: "The ego refuses to be distressed by the provocations of reality, to let itself be compelled to suffer. It insists that it cannot be affected by the traumas of the external world; it shows, in fact, that such traumas are no more than occasions for it to gain pleasure." Some other sociologists elaborated this concept further. At the same time, Paul Lewis warns that this "relieving" aspect of gallows jokes depends on the context of the joke: whether the joke is being told by the threatened person themselves or by someone else.

Black comedy has the social effect of strengthening the morale of the oppressed and undermines the morale of the oppressors. According to Wylie Sypher, "to be able to laugh at evil and error means we have surmounted them."

Black comedy is a natural human instinct and examples of it can be found in stories from antiquity. Its use was widespread in middle Europe, from where it was imported to the United States. It is rendered with the German expression Galgenhumor (cynical last words before getting hanged ). The concept of gallows humor is comparable to the French expression rire jaune (lit. yellow laughing), which also has a Germanic equivalent in the Belgian Dutch expression groen lachen (lit. green laughing).

Italian comedian Daniele Luttazzi discussed gallows humour focusing on the particular type of laughter that it arouses (risata verde or groen lachen), and said that grotesque satire, as opposed to ironic satire, is the one that most often arouses this kind of laughter. In the Weimar era Kabaretts, this genre was particularly common, and according to Luttazzi, Karl Valentin and Karl Kraus were the major masters of it.

Black comedy is common in professions and environments where workers routinely have to deal with dark subject matter. This includes police officers, firefighters, ambulance crews, military personnel, journalists, and funeral directors, where it is an acknowledged coping mechanism. It has been encouraged within these professions to make note of the context in which these jokes are told, as outsiders may not react the way that those with mutual knowledge do.

A 2017 study published in the journal Cognitive Processing concludes that people who appreciate dark humor "may have higher IQs, show lower aggression, and resist negative feelings more effectively than people who turn up their noses at it."

Examples 

There are multiple recorded instances of humorous last words and final statements. For example, author and playwright Oscar Wilde was destitute and living in a cheap boarding house when he found himself on his deathbed. There are variations on what his exact words were, but his reputed last words were, "Either that wallpaper goes or I do."

Gallows speeches
Examples of gallows speeches include:

 In Edo period Japan, condemned criminals were occasionally executed by expert swordsmen, who used living bodies to test the quality of their blade (Tameshigiri). There is an apocryphal story of one who, after being told he was to be executed by a sword tester, calmly joked that if he had known that was going to happen, he would have swallowed large stones to damage the blade.
 As Thomas More climbed a rickety scaffold where he would be executed, he said to his executioner: "I pray you, Mr. Lieutenant, see me safe up; and for my coming down, let me shift for myself."
 Robert-François Damiens, a French man who attempted to assassinate king Louis XV, was sentenced on March 26, 1757, to be executed in a gruesome and painstakingly detailed manner. He would first be led to the gallows, holding a torch with 2 lbs of burning wax. Pliers would then be used to tear his skin at the breast, arms and legs. Then his right arm, which held the knife he had used for his crime, would be burned with sulfur. The aforementioned areas with ripped skin would then be poured upon with molten lead, boiling oil, burning pitch, wax and sulfur. His body would then be dismembered by four horses, the members and trunk consumed in fire, and the ashes would be spread in the wind. After hearing the sentence, Damiens is reported to have replied: "Well, it's going to be a tough day."
 During the French Revolution, Georges-Jacques Danton, who had facial scars from smallpox, when he was about to be beheaded with a guillotine on April 5, 1794, is reported to have said to the executioner: "Don't forget to show my head to the people, it's well worth it!"
 At his public execution, the murderer William Palmer is said to have looked at the trapdoor on the gallows and asked the hangman, "Are you sure it's safe?"
 Murderer James French  days prior to his death by electric chair, exchanged these words with reporter Bob Gregory: "[S]haking hands as French prepared to return to death row, he leaned over to say: –If I were covering my execution, do you know what I'd say in the newspaper headline? –What? –'French Fries' See ya."
 John Amery, hanged for treason in 1945, said to the executioner Albert Pierrepoint "I've always wanted to meet you, Mr. Pierrepoint, though not of course under these circumstances!"
 Neville Heath was hanged for murder in 1946.  A few minutes prior to his execution, as was the custom, Heath was offered a glass of whisky to steady his nerves by the prison governor.  He replied, "While you're about it, sir, you might make that a double."
Saint Lawrence, after distributing treasures of the Church to the poor rather than turning them over to the prefect of Rome who demanded them as tribute, was martyred in the year 258 by being grilled alive upon a gridiron with hot coals beneath.  It is reported that after a long while of enduring this torture, he quipped cheerfully to his executioners: "I'm well done on this side. Turn me over!"

Military

Military life is full of gallows humor, as those in the services continuously live in the danger of being killed, especially in wartime. For example:
 The Imperial Japanese Navy Mitsubishi G4M (code named Betty bomber)  bomber aircraft was called , meaning cigar by the Japanese crews not only because its fuselage was cigar-shaped, but because it had a tendency to ignite and burn violently when it was hit.
 Soviet pilots in World War II joked that the true meaning of the type designation of the LaGG-3 was Lakirovannyy Garantirovannyy Grob, "varnished guaranteed coffin".
 American tanks of the Second World War, such as the  M3 Lee medium tank, which were supplied to the USSR under the Lend-Lease program,  were called in Russian BM-6 -Bratskaya Mogila na shesterykh ("mass grave for six crewmen" - "General Lee" model) or BM-7 -Bratskaya Mogila na semerykh ("General Grant" model) by Soviet soldiers, as penetrative hits would fragment inside the vehicle, killing the crew. Similar names were used for domestic multi-turreted tanks, chiefly the T-28 medium tank and T-35 heavy tank models, for their cramped internal layouts and poor armor protection.
 In the Battle of Jutland (May 31 – June 1, 1916), the destroyer  was sunk in an overnight engagement with the heavily armed German dreadnought . Only 13 crewmen survived out of a complement of 197 officers & men. The survivors were identified in the darkness by the crew of  because they were heard in the distance, singing, "It's a long way to Tipperary".

Emergency service workers
Workers in the emergency services are also known for using black comedy:
Graham Wettone, a retired English police officer who wrote a book How To Be A Police Officer, noted the presence of black comedy in the police force. He described it as "often not the type of humour that can be understood outside policing or the other emergency services." For example, an officer who had attended four cases of suicide by hanging in six months was nicknamed "Albert" (after the hangman Albert Pierrepoint) and encountered comments like "You hanging around the canteen today?"
In 2018, a Massachusetts firefighter was reprimanded for a response to a call about a cat stuck in a tree. The firefighter told the caller that the cat would probably make its own way down as he had never seen a cat skeleton in a tree before. An opinion article in Fire Chief magazine said that these kinds of jokes were common in the fire service, but would be inappropriate to share with a concerned member of the public.

Other

There are several titles such as It Only Hurts When I Laugh and Only When I Laugh, which allude to the punch line of a joke which exists in numerous versions since at least the 19th century. A typical setup is that someone badly hurt is asked "Does it hurt?" — "I am fine; it only hurts when I laugh."

See also 
 Cruel jokes series

 Cringe comedy

 Blue comedy

 Comedy horror

 Macabre

 Satire (film and television)

 Surreal humour

References 

 
Film genres
Humour
Jokes
Stand-up comedy